Fatih Kısaparmak (b. 31 January 1961) is a Turkish folk music artist, songwriter, photographer, composer, poet, musician, television presenter, and baglama virtuoso.

Albums 
 Kilim - Nazlı Bebe (1987) (Ferdifon Music)
 Yarına Kaç Var - Bekle Küçüğüm (1989) (Quality Trade Plaque)
 Cemre Düşünce (1990) (Caravan Plaque)
 Güneşi Biz Uyandırdık (1991) (Istanbul Plaque)
 Portakal Çiçeğim (1992) (Sindoma Music)
 Dicle'nin Oğlu (1993) (Great Record)
 Hoşçakal (1994) (Ulus Music)
 Fatih Kısaparmak'tan Hitler (1994) (Prestige Music)
 Mozaik 1 (1995) (Gürses Cassettecilik)
 Mozaik 2 (1996) (Ozulku Music)
 Olur Mu Böyle Hasan (1998) (İdobay Music)
 Mor Salkımlı Sokak...Ve Senin Şiirlerim (1999) (Erol Köse Production)
 Bu Dağ Ne Rüzgarlar Gördü (2000) (Gold Record)
 Vay Benim Hayallerim (2001) (Akbas Music)
 Sevdaysa Sevda, Kavgaysa Kavga (2003) (GAM Music)
 Ben İki Kere Ağladım (2004) (Kalan Music)
 Belki Dönemem Anne (2007) (TMC Music)
 Mor Salkimli Sokak ve Senin Siirlerim (2008) (Arpeggio Production)
 Ask Ve Özgürlük Icin (2009) (Black Sea Music)
 Sonsuza Kadar (2013) (Iberian Music)

References 

1961 births
Turkish folk musicians
Turkish folk-pop singers
Turkish folk poets
Ashiks
20th-century Turkish male musicians
21st-century Turkish male musicians
Living people
Turkish lyricists
Turkish male songwriters
Turkish composers
Bağlama players
Maden District
People from Elazığ
Turkish television presenters
Turkish television talk show hosts
Hacettepe University Ankara State Conservatory alumni
Turkish painters
21st-century Turkish painters
Turkish male painters